Muncie Southside High School (SHS) in Muncie, Indiana, United States, was a public high school which had an enrollment of 1,075 during the 2007/2008 school year.  The school was part of the Muncie Community Schools Corp. It opened on September 6, 1962 and closed on June 13, 2014.  The school was located at 1601 E. 26th Street. The graduating class of 2014 was the final graduating class, the building has become a middle school, and high school students have consolidated into one high school at Muncie Central High School.

Notable alumni
 Brandon Gorin, football player
 Richie Lewis, baseball player
 Jamill Smith, football player

References

External links

Muncie Community Schools
Muncie Community Schools High School Consolidation Records Archives and Special Collections, Ball State University Libraries (PDF)
Muncie High School Consolidation Oral History Project Digital Media Repository, Ball State University Libraries

Educational institutions established in 1962
Public high schools in Indiana
Schools in Delaware County, Indiana
Buildings and structures in Muncie, Indiana
Education in Muncie, Indiana
1962 establishments in Indiana
2014 disestablishments in Indiana